My Birthday Song is a 2018 Bollywood psychological thriller film produced and directed by Samir Soni. The film stars the co-producer Sanjay Suri with Nora Fatehi, Zenia Starr and Ayaz Khan in supporting roles. The film revolves around a happily-married man and the song on his 40th birthday. It was released on 19 January 2018.

Plot
Rajiv (Suri) is celebrating his 40th birthday with his friends when he meets a stranger named Sandy (Fatehi) and is intimate with her. She is killed accidentally by pieces of broken glass in the back of her head. Rajiv is stunned looking at the blood-soaked pillow and gulps a lot of alcohol with sleeping pills. The next morning, he wakes up to realise that everything that he was experiencing was just a dream but, as the day progresses, the events that take place in his life and the people that he comes across make him question whether what happened last night was a dream or did it actually happen. He calls his friend to check if his friend is fetching Sandy for the evening party. His friend is shocked as Rajiv was not told about it earlier. Rajiv discovers that Sandy is alive and staying at a hotel, where he calls her and asks to meet her. Sandy is the same girl he had met a few years before for his advertisement shoot and had spent the night with and forgotten.

Sandy tries to be intimate with Rajiv at the hotel room, but he tells her he saw her dying at the p party. When she hugs him, he remembers the dream suddenly and pushes her back abruptly. She falls on a glass that breaks in her head and she lies on the floor with blood all over. Rajiv is now scared that his dream has come true. On the way back, he is stopped by the police for speeding and asked for his licence. He shows it to the policeman and sees his father's picture in his wallet. He recollects a childhood scene where his parents fought over the dinner table and the argument ended with their separation. On the way, his car suddenly breaks down on a remote road with the engine smoking. Out of the blue, a mechanic walks up to him with a tool kit and wishes him happy birthday as he ponders the situation. It can only be a fortunate day, a birthday, when someone's car breaks down and a mechanic comes up with a toolkit. Meanwhile, his car's tire is also punctured which he gets repaired. Before leaving, the mechanic murmurs him a statement and says "Apki Sandy ready hai, sir." Rajiv is stunned again and looks for the mechanic, but he has disappeared.

Rajiv starts his car and journey again. On his way, he remembers the good times spent with his wife on anniversary days and Sandy's head in blood again.

Cast 
 Sanjay Suri as Rajiv Kaul
 Nora Fatehi as Sandy
 Zenia Starr as Ritu
 Ayaz Khan as Vikram Acharya
 Sameer Sharma as Ravi Kaul
 Elena Kazan as Amy
 Suparna Krishna as Achala
 Aarti Khetarpal as Annie
 Aryan Veir Suri as Young Rajiv
 Kaushar Ali Khan as Vijay
 Aalam Bedi as Yash Kaul
 Rohan Awasthi as Maanav Kaul
 Poonam Kindo as Madhu
 Savitri Wahi as Nani Maa
 Mayana Sherawat as Baby Sandy
 Devishi Sharma as Young Sandy
 Purab Kohli as Ashish (cameo)
 Pitobash Tripathy as Waiter/Mechanic (cameo)

Soundtrack

The film's songs were composed by Rajeev V Bhalla, Ajay Govind, Nitin Krishna Menon, Pawan Rasaily and Joi Barua with background music by Pawan Rasaily.

Critical response
The Times of India rated the film with 2.5/5 stars saying that it is for the audience which likes dark and mysterious cinema. Rajeev Masand of News 18 wrote that the film kept him guessing until the end and said, "It's not a perfect film, but there's enough to merit a single watch," and gave 2.5/5 stars. Sify mentioned that the film is looks good and that the first-time director Soni seems to grasp the secret of audiences' collective gasp. Rediff wrote that this psychological thriller is an honest effort and a huge relief for movie enthusiasts and gave 3.5/5 stars. Shubhra Gupta of The Indian Express gave the film a rating of 1.5 out of 5 and said, "The plotting and the treatment of My Birthday Song is far too inept to create a solid psychological thriller out of this looping-upon-itself story, whose big reveal is too brief, too late." Sweta Kaushal of The Hindustan Times gave the film a rating of 2 stars out of 5 and said that, "Debutante director Samir Soni starts off with an amazing idea which is failed by its execution. It is the heavy-footed treatment of the film that fails it. It is so over-dramatic that even the solid theme on which it is based gets lost."

References

External links 
  
 

Indian psychological thriller films
2010s Hindi-language films
2018 directorial debut films
2018 psychological thriller films
2018 thriller films